Jindřichovice is a municipality and village in Sokolov District in the Karlovy Vary Region of the Czech Republic. It has about 500 inhabitants.

Administrative parts
The village of Háj is an administrative part of Jindřichovice.

History
The first written mention of Jindřichovice is in a deed of Pope Gregory X from 1273.

Until 1918, Heinrichsgrün was part of the Austrian monarchy (Austria side after the compromise of 1867), in the Graslitz (Kraslice) district, one of the 94 Bezirkshauptmannschaften in Bohemia.

In 1938, it was annexed by Nazi Germany following Munich Agreement and administered as a part of Reichsgau Sudetenland. The German-speaking population was expelled in 1945 according the Beneš decrees and partially replaced by citizens of Czechoslovakia.

References

Villages in Sokolov District
Villages in the Ore Mountains